Hina Shaheen (born 21 March 1971) is a Pakistani TV, film stage actress and stage mujra lady.

Early life
Hina shaheen was born in Lahore, Punjab, Pakistan in a middle class family. She graduated in Commerce from the Lahore College of Commerce.

Acting career 
She started her career as a television actress and acted in a few TV serials in earlier 1990s. She has also worked with Ad producer/Director Masood Rizvi brother of famous film director Saeed Rizvi. Afterwards she turned towards Film industry and acted in few films. Dil in 1991 was her debut movie with, Reema, Shan, but she never got much success and she never ended up getting any lead roles. After failure in film she turned towards stage dramas.  Her stage performances brought her much needed fame. Shaheen is only working in stage dramas these days.

She is quite popular because of her super hit dance in stages plays. She acted in a large number of stage plays and earned fame from it. People like her dances very much and come to see her dance in stage dramas. She performed in Punjabi theater in Lahore and other cities of Punjab. In 2009 due to her fame in stage dramas she got a role in Saleem Bajwa movie Channa Sachi Muchi starring Saima, Moammar Rana and Baber Ali.

Movie list

Riaz Gujjar (1991) Anjuman, Sultan Rahi, Hina Shaheen, Humayun Qureshi
Dil (1991) Reema Khan, Shaan, Rustam, Talish, Abid Ali, Hina Shaheen
Baghi (1992) Hina Shaheen, Sultan Rahi, Ghulam Mohiuddin
Police Story (1992) Sahiba, Danish, Prince, Hina Shaheen
Ishq Rehna Sada	(1992) Sahiba, Asad Malik, Khushboo, Hina Shaheen
Koday Shah (1992) Ajab Gul, Rangeela, Hina Shaheen
Channa Sachi Muchi (2010) Saima Noor, Moammar Rana, Hina Shaheen, Baber Ali.

Notable stage dramas
Khattay Meethay Mummy
Cast:- Hina Shaheen, Iftikhar Thakur, Tariq Teddy, Zafri Khan, Deedar, .
De Dhana Dan
Cast:- Hina Shaheen, Iftikhar Thakur, Tariq Teddy, Tahir Naushad, Khushboo,
Hina Janu ki class
Cast:-Hina Shaheen, Tariq Teddy, Zafri Khan, Gulfaam, Anjuman Shehzadi
Ghussa Laal Kara De
Cast:- Hina Shaheen, Amanullah Khan, Iftikhar Thakur, Kodu.
اندر کرا سوھنی
Cast: Hina Shaheen, Iftikhar Thakur, Naseem Vicky, Amanat Chan, .
Zara Jhoom Jhoom Kiss Kar
Cast:- Hina Shaheen, Iftikhar Thakur, Zafri Khan, Saajan Abbass, Kodu, Shezah.
Shadi Se Pehle Ander Liya
Cast: Hina Shaheen Chuppa, Nasir Chinyoti, Tariq Teddy, Sakhawat Naz, Deedar, Naseem Vicky, Zafri Khan.
Mumma Chan Warga
Cast:- Hina Shaheen, Amanullah Khan, Sohail Ahmed, Amanat Chan, Akram Udas, Nawaz Anjum, Jawad Waseem, Megha, Zara Akbar.
Soney Ka Raad
Cast:-Hina Shaheen, Sohail Ahmed, Mastana, Shouki Khan, Anwar Ali, Tariq Javed, Ismail Tara, Irfan Khoosat.
Mummy Chan Wargay
Cast:- Hina Shaheen, Amanullah Khan, Amanat Chan, Naseem Vicky, Sheeza, Saajan Abbass.
Hina Mast Ma'am 
Cast:- Hina Shaheen, Iftikhar Thakur, Tariq Teddy, Amanat Chan, Saajan Abbass.
Garam Garam
Cholla Chaat
Cast:-Naseem Vicky, Anjuman Shehzadi, Tariq Teddy, Nasir Chinyoti, Kodu, Hina Shaheen, Sohail Ahmed, Iftikhar Thakur, Zafri Khan, Nadia Ali, Nawaz Anjum, Zara Akbar.
Main Sadkay Jaawan Hina De
Cast: Hina Shaheen, Iftikhar Thakur, Nasir Chinyoti, Deedar, Zafri, Kodu, Sakhawat Naz.
Hina di Khol Dayo Part 1
Cast:- Hina Shaheen, Iftikhar Thakur, Sohail Ahmad, Zara Akbar, Nasir Chinyoti, Ayesha Chaudhry, Zafri Khan, Sohni, Amanat Chann, Beena Saher, Akram Udas, Shahzada.

References

1971 births
Living people
Pakistani film actresses
Pakistani female dancers
Female dancers
Pakistani stage actresses
Pakistani television actresses
Actresses from Lahore
20th-century Pakistani actresses
21st-century Pakistani actresses